Xavier Blond (born 18 June 1965) is a French biathlete. He competed at the 1988 Winter Olympics and the 1992 Winter Olympics.

References

1965 births
Living people
French male biathletes
Olympic biathletes of France
Biathletes at the 1988 Winter Olympics
Biathletes at the 1992 Winter Olympics
Sportspeople from Grenoble